Voxx is a 1980 rock album by the Bay City Rollers.  It was the second of three LPs the group issued as The Rollers.

The disc featured an unlikely hodgepodge of songs culled from various sources.  Two tracks ("Soho" and "The Hero") were unused tunes from the Elevator sessions, another two ("Honey Don't Leave L.A." and "New York") were re-recordings of Duncan Faure solo tracks, and "Working for the People" was a redo of a Rabbitt song.  "Rebel Rebel" is presented in a live version, lifted from the 1977 Budokan concert that would be released in 2001 as Rollerworld.  Production was credited to "Ricky Fender", an alias of Eric Faulkner, with Peter Ker credited for the two Elevator tracks.

Voxx was the Rollers' final LP for Arista Records, and was released only in Germany and Japan.  A CD edition has been issued in Japan and in the UK.

Track listing
"God Save Rock and Roll" (Faulkner, Faure)
"Working for the People" (Faure, Rabbitt)
"Soho" (Faulkner)
"The Hero" (Faulkner)
"'85" (Faulkner)
"Honey Don't Leave L.A." (Faure)
"New York" (Faure)
"The Jig" (Traditional; arranged by The Rollers)
"Only the Young Die Old" (Faulkner)
"Rebel Rebel" (David Bowie)

Personnel

Group members
Eric Faulkner – Guitar, vocals, lead vocal on "Rebel Rebel"
Duncan Faure – Lead vocals, piano, moog, guitars
Alan Longmuir – Guitar, bass, vocals, keyboards
Derek Longmuir – Drums, percussion
Stuart "Woody" Wood - Bass, keyboards, vocals

Other personnel
Peter Kerr – Producer
 Ricky Fender – Producer except The Hero and Soho

References

Bay City Rollers albums
1980 albums
Arista Records albums